Gardenia remyi, the nānū or Remy's gardenia, is a species of flowering tree in the madder family, Rubiaceae.

It is endemic to Hawaii.

It is threatened by habitat loss.

References

remyi
Endemic flora of Hawaii
Trees of Hawaii
Taxonomy articles created by Polbot
Critically endangered flora of the United States